Moronou Region is one of the 31 regions of Ivory Coast. Since its creation in 2012, it has been one of four regions in Lacs District. The seat of the region is Bongouanou and the region's population in the 2021 census was 439,755.

Moronou is currently divided into three departments: Arrah, Bongouanou, and M'Batto.

Moronou is the most recently created region of Ivory Coast. It was formed in 2012 after the other 30 regions had been organised in 2011. Moronou was created by splitting off three departments from N'Zi Region.

Regional Council of Moronou

Election Results

Notes

 
Regions of Lacs District
States and territories established in 2012
2012 establishments in Ivory Coast